Ike or IKE may refer to:

People
 Ike (given name), a list of people with the name or nickname
 Dwight D. Eisenhower (1890–1969), Supreme Commander of the Allied forces in Europe during World War II and President of the United States and mostly called “Ike”

Surname
 Ike no Taiga (1723–1776), Japanese painter
 Chika Ike (born 1985), Nigerian actress
 Ike Gyokuran (1727–1784), Japanese painter
 Reiko Ike (born 1953), Japanese actress

Storms
 Severe tropical storm Ike (Bining), in the 1981 Pacific typhoon season
 Typhoon Ike (Nitang), in the 1984 Pacific typhoon season
 Hurricane Ike (2008), in the Greater Antilles and Northern America

Arts and entertainment
 Ike (miniseries), a 1979 television miniseries about Eisenhower
 Ike: Countdown to D-Day, a 2004 American television film
Ike, a fictional moon in the game Kerbal Space Program

Transportation and military
 Ikerasak Heliport (LID airport code), Greenland
 USS Dwight D. Eisenhower, an aircraft carrier
 Dwight D. Eisenhower Expressway, part of Interstate 290

Other uses
 Internet Key Exchange, a network protocol used by IPsec VPNs
 IKE Group, economic research group at Aalborg University, Denmark
 Ike, Texas, an unincorporated community in the US
 Inuktitut (ISO 639-3 code: ike), an Inuit language of Canada
 Ike (Fire Emblem), one of the main characters from the Fire Emblem game series